William Lytle may refer to:

 William Lytle (captain) (1728–1797), officer in the Continental Army during the American Revolution
 William Lytle II (died 1831), his son, Surveyor General of Illinois
 William Haines Lytle (1826–1864), his nephew, Ohioan poet and politician
 William Lytle, father of Rob Lytle, American football player

See also
 Lytle family